Miss Universe Spain 2016 was the fourth edition of the Miss Universe Spain beauty contest. It was held on December 5, 2016, at the Barceló Theater in the city of Madrid. Sofía del Prado, second runner-up of Miss Spain Universe 2015 and winner of Reina Hispanoamericana 2015, crowned Noelia Freire Benito as Miss Spain Universe 2016, which will represent Spain in the Miss Universe 2016 contest.

Results

Placements

Special awards

Candidates
17 candidates will compete in the contest:

References

Miss Spain
2016 in Spain
Universe Spain